Gunnar Örn Örlygsson (born 4 August 1971) is a former Icelandic politician and former basketball player.

Political career
Gunnar was a member of Alþingi for the Liberal Party from 2003 until he split from the party in 2005 and joined the Independence Party for whom he served as a parliamentarian until 2007.

Basketball career
Gunnar played 11 seasons in the Icelandic top-tier Úrvalsdeild karla, averaging 6.1 points per game. He was the chairman of Ungmennafélag Njarðvíkur basketball department from 2014 to December 2016. In 1991, he won the three-point shooting contest at the Icelandic All-Star game.

Personal life
Gunnar is the brother of former Icelandic national team players Sturla Örlygsson and Teitur Örlygsson. He is also uncle of Örlygur Aron Sturluson and Margrét Kara Sturludóttir who both played for the Icelandic national teams.

References

External links
Althing biography
Úrvalsdeild karla statistics at kki.is

1971 births
Gunnar Orn Orlygsson
Gunnar Orn Orlygsson
Gunnar Orn Orlygsson
Gunnar Orn Orlygsson
Gunnar Orn Orlygsson
Gunnar Orn Orlygsson
Gunnar Orn Orlygsson
Living people